The Inva (Russian: Иньва) is a river in Perm Krai, Russia, a right tributary of the river Kama. It begins in the Upper Kama Upland near the border of Kirov oblast then flows through Komi-Permyak Okrug and into Kama Reservoir, forming Invensky Bay.  The main tributaries are Velva and Kuva (left), Yusva (right).

It is frozen from early November to late April. 
The town of Kudymkar is along the Inva River.

Etymology
The name of the river is formed from the Komi-Permyak words “инь” (woman) and “ва” (water), which can be translated as “female water”.

References

External links  
Inva in Great Soviet Encyclopedia

Rivers of Perm Krai